Ravindra Kapoor was an Indian character actor in Hindi and Punjabi language films. He was the brother of Nandkishore Kapoor and veteran actor Kamal Kapoor.

Career
Some of his popular films are “Caravan” in 1971 where he played veteran actor Jeetendra's friend along with Hum Kisise Kum Naheen (1977), Kankan De Ohle (1970) and Jo Jeeta Wohi Sikandar (1992).

Filmography

Television
Junoon as Thakur Diwan (From Episode no 1 to 7)

References

External links
 

20th-century Indian male actors
Male actors from Mumbai
Male actors in Hindi cinema
Kapoor family